Utica Free Academy, whose predecessor, Utica Academy, opened in 1814, was a high school in Utica, New York, which operated from 1840 until 1990, when it was consolidated with Thomas R. Proctor High School. The combined entity operated briefly at UFA's original facility under the name Utica Senior Academy, but by 1993 had been reverted to the Proctor name and heritage.

The last UFA building is now a nursing home.

Notable alumni
Dean Alfange, politician
Richard H. Balch, businessperson and politician
Tim Capstraw, basketball coach and broadcaster
Mark Danner, writer, journalist, and educator
Cyrus D. Prescott, politician and lawyer
John Ballard Rendall (1847–1924), minister, Lincoln University president, and Pennsylvania state representative
Mary Traffarn Whitney (1852–1942), minister, editor, social reformer, philanthropist, lecturer

References

External links

Buildings and structures in Utica, New York
Defunct schools in New York (state)
Buildings and structures in Oneida County, New York
Educational institutions established in 1840
Educational institutions disestablished in 1990
1840 establishments in New York (state)
1990 disestablishments in New York (state)